The Mobility in Harmony Consortium, also known as the MIH Consortium, is a Foxconn led open electric vehicle development platform.

History 
The MIH consortium was created in 2020 by Foxconn to promote a set of open standards for electric vehicles.

In July 2022 the consortium had 2,407 members from 65 countries.

Members 
 Karma Automotive
 Foxconn
 Tata Technologies
 Lordstown Motors
 TomTom
 Yulon
 Microsoft
 PTT Public Company Limited
 TECO Electric and Machinery
 Autocrypt
 Mazibuko Motor Company

Platforms

Open EV Software Platform 
The Open EV Software Platform was developed by MIH, Arm Ltd, Microsoft, and Trend Micro.

References 

Technology consortia
Battery electric vehicle organizations